Vexillum virgo, common name : the virgin mitre, is a species of small sea snail, marine gastropod mollusk in the family Costellariidae, the ribbed miters.

Description
The shell size varies between 13 mm and 25 mm

Distribution
This species is distributed in the Red Sea and in the Indo-West Pacific and in the Pacific Ocean along Samoa, Australia and Papua New Guinea.

References

 Vine, P. (1986). Red Sea Invertebrates. Immel Publishing, London. 224 pp
 Turner H. 2001. Katalog der Familie Costellariidae Macdonald, 1860. Conchbooks. 1–100-page(s): 67

External links
 
  Cernohorsky, Walter Oliver. The Mitridae of Fiji; The veliger vol. 8 (1965)

virgo
Gastropods described in 1767
Taxa named by Carl Linnaeus